František Janák (born 1951 in Havlíčkův Brod, Czechoslovakia) is a Czech glass artist. He creates glass sculptures and commission works, and also does series production design for different Czech glassworks.

Janák completed his apprenticeship in glass cutting at the Bohemia Glassworks, Czech's biggest producer of hand cut lead crystal.  He followed with studies at the Secondary School of Glassmaking in Kamenický Šenov, the oldest glass school in the world (founded 1856). From 1971-72 he was head master at the Bohemia Glassworks school, followed by three years as a glass cutter at the Co-op Výtvarná řemesla in Prague. From 1975-81 Janák studied at the Academy of Applied Arts in Prague under Prof. Stanislav Libenský.

In 1981, Janák opened his own studio in Dolní Město. From 1985 to 1988 he was a glass designer at the Institute of Interior and Fashion Design - ÚBOK Prague. From 1989 to 1993 he was again a free-lance glass artist at his own studio, this time in Prague. From 1993-95 he was a glass designer at the LINEA-ÚBOK in Prague.

From 1995 to 1997 Janák was a visiting professor at the Toyama Institute of Glass Art in Toyama (TIGA), Japan. In 1997, he returned to his studio in Prague. In 1998, he was appointed Professor at the Secondary School of Glassmaking in Kamenický  Šenov. In 2000-01, he was visiting assistant professor at the Rochester Institute of Technology, Rochester, New York, United States.

Since 2003, Janák has been a professor at the Secondary School of Glassmaking in Kamenický  Šenov and is leader of the school's section of glass cutting.

His art is included in museums throughout the world, including Glasmuseet Ebeltoft, Denmark; Ulster Museum, Belfast, Northern Ireland; Finnish Glass Museum, Riihimäki, Finland; Rippl Ronai Museum. Káposvár, Hungary; Museum of Modern Art, Düsseldorf, Germany; the collection of the city Toyama, Japan; and Museum of Glass, Tacoma, Washington, USA.

His commissioned works include:
Three stained glass windows, church in Svatobořice – Mistřín, Czech Republic (1986).
Stained glass windows and mobile fountain, Agrobank Pardubice, Czech Republic (1993).
Waterfall (glass object), Hotel Orfeus, Poděbrady, Czech Republic (1995).
Messenger (glass object), Aubade hall, Toyama, Japan (1996).

Awards 
1981 - Rector prize at the Academy of Applied Arts in Prague.
1982 - Urkunde Jugend gestaltet in Munich, Germany.
1985 - Special prize at the Second Coburger glass prize in Coburg, Germany.
1986 - First prize at the 4th Quadrennial in Erfurt, Germany.
1988 - Diploma at the exhibition of WCC-Europe in Stuttgart, Germany.
1995 - Pavel Hlava prize at the International Exhibition of Glass in Kanazawa, Japan.
2000 - Honorable mention at the exhibition Millennium glass in Mostly Glass, USA.

Janák also received several prizes for industrial design in the Czech Republic.

References

External links
 Biography and pictures of his works
 http://www.czech-glass-school.com/ucitele/janak/janak.html
 http://www.prismcontemporary.com/Artists/JanakF/JanakF.html

1951 births
Living people
Czech artists
Glass artists
People from Havlíčkův Brod
Artists from Prague